Karydia (before 1927: Τέχοβο - Techovo, Macedonian and Bulgarian: Техово, Tehovo) is a village in the municipality of Edessa, Pella regional unit, northern Greece. It is situated 9 km northwest of Edessa. At the church in the locality Kosteno (Macedonian and Bulgarian: Костен, Kosten) there is an annual festival on 21 May, the day of Saint Helena.

History

There were 81 Christian households in the village of Tehova in 1619–1620.

In the book "Ethnographie des Vilayets d'Adrianople, de Monastir et de Salonique", published in Constantinople in 1878, that reflects the statistics of the male population in 1873, Téhovo was noted as a village with 187 households and 880 Bulgarian inhabitants.

In 1900, Vasil Kanchov gathered and compiled statistics on demographics in the area and reported that the village of Teovo was inhabited by 604 Bulgarian Christians.

References

Populated places in Pella (regional unit)
Edessa, Greece